The Chiltern Hills, a chalk escarpment in England northwest of London, covers  across Oxfordshire, Buckinghamshire, Hertfordshire, and Bedfordshire, stretching  from Goring-on-Thames in the southwest to Hitchin in the northeast.

In 1965, almost half of the Chiltern Hills was designated as an Area of Outstanding Natural Beauty (AONB). The northwest boundary is clearly defined by the escarpment. The dip slope is by definition more gradual, and merges with the landscape to the southeast. The southwest endpoint is the River Thames. The hills decline slowly in prominence in northeast Bedfordshire.

Geology

The chalk escarpment of the Chiltern Hills overlooks the Vale of Aylesbury and roughly coincides with the southernmost extent of the ice sheet during the Anglian glacial maximum. The Chiltern Hills are part of a system of chalk downlands throughout eastern and southern England, formed between 65 and 95 million years ago, comprising rocks of the Chalk Group; this also includes Salisbury Plain, Cranborne Chase, the Isle of Wight and the South Downs in the south. In the north, the chalk formations continue northeastwards across Hertfordshire, Norfolk and the Lincolnshire Wolds, finally ending as the Yorkshire Wolds in a prominent escarpment, south of the Vale of Pickering. The beds of the Chalk Group were deposited over the buried northwestern margin of the Anglo-Brabant Massif during the Late Cretaceous. During this time, sources for siliciclastic sediment had been eliminated due to the exceptionally high sea level. The formation is thinner through the Chiltern Hills than the chalk strata to the north and south and deposition was tectonically controlled, with the Lilley Bottom structure playing a significant role at times. The Chalk Group, like the underlying Gault Clay and Upper Greensand, is diachronous.

During the late stages of the Alpine Orogeny, as the African Plate collided with Eurasian Plate, Mesozoic extensional structures, such as the Weald Basin of southern England, underwent structural inversion. This phase of deformation tilted the chalk strata to the southeast in the area of the Chiltern Hills. The gently dipping beds of rock were eroded, forming an escarpment.

The chalk strata are frequently interspersed with layers of flint nodules which apparently replaced chalk and infilled pore spaces early in the diagenetic history. Flint has been mined for millennia from the Chiltern Hills. They were first extracted for fabrication into flint axes in the Neolithic period, then for knapping into flintlocks. Nodules are to be seen everywhere in the older houses as a construction material for walls.

Physical characteristics

Topography

The highest point is at 267 m (876 ft.) above sea level at Haddington Hill near Wendover in Buckinghamshire; a stone monument marks the summit. The nearby Ivinghoe Beacon is a more prominent hill, although its altitude is only 249 m (817 ft.). It is the starting point of the Icknield Way Path and the Ridgeway long-distance path, which follows the line of the Chiltern Hill for many miles to the west, where they merge with the Wiltshire downs and southern Cotswolds. To the east of Ivinghoe Beacon is Dunstable Downs, a steep section of the Chiltern scarp. Near Wendover is Coombe Hill, 260 m (852 ft.) above sea level. The more gently sloping country – the dip slope – to the southeast of the Chiltern scarp is also generally referred to as part of the Chiltern Hills; it contains much beech woodland and many villages.

Landscape and land use
Enclosed fields account for almost 66% of the "Area of Outstanding Natural Beauty" (AONB) area. The next most important, and archetypal, landscape form is woodland, covering 21% of the Chiltern Hills, which is thus one of the most heavily wooded areas in England. Built-up areas (settlements and industry) make up over 5% of the land area; parks and gardens nearly 4%, open land (commons, heaths and downland) is 2%, and the remaining 2% includes a variety of uses, including communications, military, open land, recreation, utilities and water.

Rivers
The Chiltern Hills are almost entirely located within the River Thames drainage basin, and also drain towards several major Thames tributaries, most notably the Lea, which rises in the eastern Chiltern Hills, the Colne to the south, and the Thame to the north and west. Other rivers arising near the Chiltern Hills include the Mimram, the Ver, the Gade, the Bulbourne, the Chess, the Misbourne and the Wye. These are classified as chalk streams, although the Lea is degraded by water from road drains and sewage treatment works. The Thames flows through a gap between the Berkshire Downs and the Chiltern Hills. Portions around Leighton Buzzard and Hitchin are drained by the Ouzel, the Flit and the Hiz, all of which ultimately flow into the River Great Ouse (the last two via the Ivel).

Transport
Several transport routes pass through the Chiltern Hills in natural or man-made corridors. The M40 motorway passes through the Chiltern Hills in Buckinghamshire and Oxfordshire sections with a deep cutting through the Stokenchurch Gap. The M1 motorway crosses the Bedfordshire section near Luton. Other major roads include the A41 and the A413.

The Chiltern Main Line Railway via High Wycombe and Princes Risborough, the London to Aylesbury Line via , the West Coast Main Line via Berkhamsted, and the Midland Main Line all run through the Chiltern Hills. The Great Western Main Line and its branches such as the Henley and Marlow branch lines link the southern side of the Chiltern Hills with London Paddington. The Chinnor and Princes Risborough Railway is a preserved line.

High Speed 2 (HS2) will pass underneath the Chiltern Hills in the Chiltern tunnel. This tunnel, the longest under construction on the HS2 route, will be  in length. The Conservation Board has made clear it was opposed to the routing of HS2 through the Chiltern Hills AONB.

Bus services are provided by Arriva Shires & Essex and Carousel Buses. Air corridors from Luton Airport pass over the Chiltern Hills.

Apart from the River Thames, there are no navigable rivers. The Grand Union Canal passes through the Chiltern Hills between Berkhamsted and Marsworth following the course of the Gade and Bulbourne. Also, after crossing a watershed, the Ouzel is partly in the Chiltern Hills.

History

During the Iron Age, the Chiltern ridge provided a relatively safe and easily navigable route across southern Britain.
The toponym, Chiltern, is believed to be  Brittonic in origin. According to Eilert Ekwall, Chiltern is possibly related to the broader ethnic name  Celt (Celtæ in early Celtic languages); the root celto- "high" (and suffix -erno-) could provide the origin of Chiltern.

Before the 18th century, the population lived dispersed across the largely rural landscape of the Chiltern Hills in remote villages, hamlets, farmsteads, and market towns along the main turnpike routes which coursed through the navigable valleys. The development of canals in the 18th century and railways in the 19th century encouraged settlement and the growth of High Wycombe, Tring, and Luton. Significant housing and industrial development took place in the first half of the 20th century and continued throughout the 20th century.

In 1965 almost half of the Chiltern Hills was designated as an Area of Outstanding Natural Beauty (AONB).

List of towns and villages in the Chiltern Hills
 Aldbury, Amersham, Apsley, Ashridge, Aston Clinton
 Barton-le-Clay, Bellingdon, Berkhamsted, Bledlow Ridge, Bovingdon, Bradenham, Breachwood Green, Buckland Common
 Caddington, Chalfont St Giles, Chalfont St Peter, Chartridge, Checkendon, Cheddington, Chesham, Chiltern Green, Chinnor, Cholesbury, Christmas Common, Coleshill
 Dagnall, Dunsmore, Dunstable
 Edlesborough, Ellesborough
 Fawley, Fingest, Flackwell Heath, Frieth
 Gerrards Cross, Goring-On-Thames, Great Hampden, Great Kingshill, Great Missenden, Great Offley
 Halton, Hambleden, Harlington, Hawridge, Hazlemere, Hemel Hempstead, Henley-on-Thames, Hexton, High Wycombe, Hitchin, Holmer Green, Hughenden, Hyde Heath
 Ibstone, Ivinghoe, Jordans, Kensworth
 Lacey Green, Lane End, Latimer, Ley Hill, Lilley, Little Chalfont, Little Gaddesden, Little Kingshill, Little Missenden, Luton
 Markyate, Marlow, Marlow Bottom, Medmenham
 Naphill, Nettlebed, Nuffield, Oxfordshire
 Penn, Pishill, Pitstone, Prestwood, Princes Risborough, Radnage, Redbourn
 Seer Green, Sharpenhoe, Shiplake, Skirmett, Southend, South Heath, Speen, St Leonards, Stokenchurch, Stonor, Streatley (Beds), Studham
 Thame, The Lee, Tring, Turville, Tylers Green
 Walter's Ash, Watlington, Wendover, West Wycombe, Whipsnade, Whitwell, Wigginton, Winchmore Hill, Woodcote

Strip parishes associated with the Chiltern Hills 
The western edge of the Chiltern Hills is notable for ancient strip parishes, elongated parishes with villages in the flatter land below the escarpment, and woodland and summer pastures in the higher land.
Bedfordshire: Eaton Bray, Toddington, Totternhoe
Buckinghamshire: Aston Clinton, Aylesbury, Bledlow, Buckland, Drayton Beauchamp, Great Kimble, Horsenden, The Lee, Marsworth, Monks Risborough, Pitstone, Princes Risborough, Saunderton, Stoke Mandeville, Weston Turville
Hertfordshire: Tring, Wigginton
Oxfordshire: Aston Rowant, Checkendon, Chinnor, Ipsden, Lewknor, Mongewell, Newnham Murren, Nuffield, Pyrton, Shirburn, South Stoke, Watlington

Economic use
The hills have been used for their natural resources for millennia. The chalk has been quarried for the manufacture of cement, and flint for local building material. Beechwoods supplied furniture makers with quality hardwood. The area was once (and still is to a lesser degree) renowned for its chair-making industry, centred on the towns of Chesham and High Wycombe (the nickname of Wycombe Wanderers Football Club is the Chairboys). Water was and remains a scarce resource in the Chiltern Hills. Historically it was drawn from the aquifer via ponds, deep wells, occasional springs or bournes and chalk streams and rivers. Today the chalk aquifer is exploited via a network of pumping stations to provide a public supply for domestic consumption, agriculture and business uses, both within and well-beyond the Chiltern Hills area. Rivers such as the River Chess directly supply watercress beds. Over-exploitation has possibly led to the disappearance of some streams over at least long periods.

In a region without building stone, local clay provided the raw materials for brick manufacture. Timber and flint were also used for construction.

Mediaeval strip parishes reflected the diversity of land from clay farmland, through wooded slopes to downland. Their boundaries were often drawn to include a section of each type of land, resulting in an irregular county boundary. These have tended to be smoothed out by successive reorganisations.

As people have come to appreciate the open country, the area has become a visitor destination and the National Trust has acquired land to preserve its character, for example at Ashridge, near Tring. In places, with the reduction of sheep grazing, action has been taken to maintain open downland by suppressing the natural growth of scrub and birch woodland. In the 1920s and 1930s, the Youth Hostels Association established several youth hostels for people visiting the hills.

The hills have been used as a location for telecommunication relay stations such as Stokenchurch BT Tower and that at Zouches Farm.

Protection

The Chiltern Hills is an Area of Outstanding Natural Beauty (AONB) and so enjoys special protection from major developments, which should not take place in such areas except in exceptional circumstances. This protection applies to major development proposals that raise issues of national significance. In 2000 the government confirmed that the landscape qualities of AONBs are equivalent to those of National Parks, and that the protection given to both types of area by the land use planning system should also be equivalent.

Chilterns Conservation Board
The Chiltern Hills Conservation Board was established by Parliamentary Order in July 2004. It is an independent body comprising 27 members drawn from the relevant local authorities and from those living in local communities within the Chiltern AONB area.

The Board's purposes are set out in Countryside and Rights of Way Act 2000: In summary these are:- First, to conserve and enhance the natural beauty of the AONB, and increase the understanding and enjoyment by the public of the special qualities of the AONB. Second, while taking account of the first purpose, to foster the economic and social wellbeing of local communities within the AONB. Third, to publish and promote the implementation of a management plan for the AONB.

In contrast to National Parks, The Chiltern Hills – as other AONBs – do not possess their own planning authority. The Board has an advisory role on planning and development matters and seeks to influence the actions of local government by commenting upon planning applications.

The local authorities (two County Councils, three Unitary Authorities and four District and Borough Councils) are expected to respect the area's status as a designated Area of Outstanding Natural Beauty.

Heritage
Examples of historical architecture in the Chiltern region are preserved at the Chiltern Open Air Museum near Chalfont St Giles. This open-air folk museum contains reconstructed buildings which might otherwise have been destroyed or demolished as a result of redevelopment or road construction.

Chiltern Hundreds

The Chiltern Hills includes the Chiltern Hundreds. By established custom, Members of Parliament (MPs) in the House of Commons of the United Kingdom, who are prohibited from resigning their seats directly, may apply for the Stewardship of the Chiltern Hundreds as a device to enable their departure from the House.

List of hills
Hills in The Chiltern Hills more than 200 metres in elevation and with more than 30 metres of topographic prominence are listed from southwest to northeast.

See also 
 Zouches Farm

References

External links
Chilterns AONB
Chilterns Conservation Board
Chilterns Tourism Network
A Year in The Chiltern Hills
Chiltern Society

 
Areas of Outstanding Natural Beauty in England
Geology of England
Hills of Bedfordshire
Hills of Buckinghamshire
Hills of Hertfordshire
Hills of Oxfordshire
Protected areas of Bedfordshire
Protected areas of Buckinghamshire
Protected areas of Oxfordshire
Protected areas of Hertfordshire
History of Berkshire
History of Oxfordshire
Escarpments of England